Ivan E. Salaverry (born January 11, 1971) is a Canadian mixed martial arts fighter and instructor. He is a member of Tito Ortiz's Team Punishment, and is known for his well-rounded skills. Salaverry is a middleweight veteran of the Ultimate Fighting Championship, BAMMA and the now-defunct World Fighting Alliance. In 2008 Salaverry fought his last fight for the UFC at UFC 84, losing to Rousimar Palhares by armbar in the first round. In 2011, Salaverry decided to return to MMA after 3 years out.

He is also notable for being a pioneer of the crucifix-style position from side control, which is often referred to as "The Salaverry" during Mixed Martial Arts broadcasts, particularly by UFC commentator Joe Rogan. He also holds notable wins over Andrei Semenov and Joe Riggs.

Mixed martial arts career
Salaverry began his MMA career in August 1999.  Over the next four years Salaverry acquired an 8-2 professional record, his most notable fight taking place in Japan for Shooto against Akihiro Gono, which he lost via KO in the first round.
In 2002 Salaverry made his UFC debut defeating Russian fighter Andrei Semenov.  Salaverry would continue to fight for the UFC, but struggled to find consistency.  He lost by decision to Matt Lindland, submitted Tony Fryklund, choked out Joe Riggs, lost a decision to Nathan Marquardt, lost via TKO to Terry Martin and lost via armbar submission to Rousimar Palhares.  After the Palhares fight, Ivan Salaverry announced his retirement from professional fighting with a 13-7 record.

Personal life
He opened his own gym, Ivan Salaverry MMA, October 2005, in Seattle, Washington, where he lives with his wife and two sons.

In a recent interview he said:
This could be it for me, I honestly can tell you. I had a very nice career. I've talked it over with my wife and family, and the priorities are really going into the school, teaching, maybe some promotions, creating a fight team. Things of that nature.

In what was believed at the time to be his last MMA fight, Salaverry took on Brazilian newcomer Rousimar Palhares at UFC 84 at the MGM Grand Garden Arena on May 24, 2008, losing by Submission (armbar) at 2:36 of Round 1.

On June 23, 2008 he announced that he was retired and would no longer compete as a professional fighter.

On 28 April 2011, it was announced that Salaverry would come out of retirement to replace the injured Phil Baroni at BAMMA 6. Here he fought Matt Ewin losing a disappointing decision. On 21 July 2012, he fought Fraser Opie for the Cage Contender Light Heavyweight title - coming in as a late replacement for former UFC fighter, Jeff Monson, who failed to make weight for the fight. He lost this fight in the second round due to an illegal headkick.

On December 11, 2015 Salaverry was promoted to Black Belt in Brazilian Jiu-jitsu by 5th Degree Black Belt Marcelo Alonso in Seattle.

On May 24, 2016 he was promoted to Brown Belt in Judo by 2nd Degree Black Belt Taylan Yuasa at his own gym in Seattle.

Mixed martial arts record

|-
| Win
| align=center| 14–9
| Jerome Jones
| Decision (unanimous)
| Cage Warrior Combat 9
| 
| align=center| 3
| align=center| 5:00
| Kent, Washington, United States 
| 
|-
| Loss
| align=center| 13–9
| Fraser Opie
| DQ (illegal kick)
| Cage Contender XIV
| 
| align=center| 2
| align=center| N/A
| Dublin, Ireland
| 
|-
| Loss
| align=center| 13–8
| Matt Ewin
| Decision (unanimous)
| BAMMA 6: Watson vs. Rua
| 
| align=center| 3
| align=center| 5:00
| London, England
| 
|-
| Loss
| align=center| 13–7
| Rousimar Palhares
| Submission (armbar)
| UFC 84
| 
| align=center| 1
| align=center| 2:36
| Las Vegas, Nevada, United States
| 
|-
| Loss
| align=center| 13–6
| Terry Martin
| TKO (suplex and punches)
| UFC 71
| 
| align=center| 1
| align=center| 2:04
| Las Vegas, Nevada, United States
| 
|-
| Win
| align=center| 13–5
| Art Santore
| TKO (punches)
| WFA: King of the Streets
| 
| align=center| 2
| align=center| 4:18
| Los Angeles, California, United States
| 
|-
| Loss
| align=center| 12–5
| Nate Marquardt
| Decision (unanimous)
| UFC Ultimate Fight Night
| 
| align=center| 3
| align=center| 5:00
| Las Vegas, Nevada, United States
| 
|-
| Win
| align=center| 12–4
| Joe Riggs
| Submission (triangle choke)
| UFC 52
| 
| align=center| 1
| align=center| 2:42
| Las Vegas, Nevada, United States
| 
|-
| Win
| align=center| 11–4
| Tony Fryklund
| Submission (body triangle)
| UFC 50
| 
| align=center| 1
| align=center| 1:36
| Atlantic City, New Jersey, United States
| 
|-
| Win
| align=center| 10–4
| Khaliun Boldbataar
| Decision (unanimous)
| K-1 Beast 2004 in Niigata
| 
| align=center| 2
| align=center| 5:00
| Niigata, Japan
| 
|-
| Loss
| align=center| 9–4
| Rene Rooze
| TKO (dislocated finger)
| K-1 Survival 2003 Japan Grand Prix Final
| 
| align=center| 1
| align=center| 2:42
| Yokohama, Japan
| 
|-
| Loss
| align=center| 9–3
| Matt Lindland
| Decision (unanimous)
| UFC 39
| 
| align=center| 3
| align=center| 5:00
| Uncasville, Connecticut, United States
| 
|-
| Win
| align=center| 9–2
| Andrei Semenov
| TKO (punches)
| UFC 37
| 
| align=center| 3
| align=center| 2:27
| Bossier City, Louisiana, United States
| 
|-
| Win
| align=center| 8–2
| John Renken
| TKO (strikes)
| HOOKnSHOOT - Overdrive
| 
| align=center| 1
| align=center| 0:23
| Evansville, Indiana, United States
| 
|-
| Win
| align=center| 7–2
| Jason Rigsby
| Decision
| HOOKnSHOOT - Kings 2
| 
| align=center| 2
| align=center| 5:00
| Evansville, Indiana, United States
| 
|-
| Win
| align=center| 6–2
| Steve Heath
| TKO (cut)
| IFC - Warriors Challenge 15
| 
| align=center| 1
| align=center| 2:54
| Oroville, California, United States
| 
|-
| Win
| align=center| 5–2
| Dan Corpstein
| KO (knees)
| AMC: Revenge of the Warriors
| 
| align=center| 2
| align=center| N/A
| Rochester, Washington, United States
| 
|-
| Loss
| align=center| 4–2
| Akihiro Gono
| KO (spinning back kick)
| Shooto - To The Top 1
| 
| align=center| 1
| align=center| 3:06
| Tokyo, Japan
| 
|-
| Win
| align=center| 4–1
| Dan Corpstein
| Submission (rear-naked choke)
| AMC - Path of the Warrior 
| 
| align=center| 2
| align=center| 0:52
| Kirkland, Washington, United States
| 
|-
| Loss
| align=center| 3–1
| Adam Ryan
| KO (punches)
| Western Canada's Toughest 2
| 
| align=center| N/A
| align=center| N/A
| Vancouver, British Columbia, Canada
| 
|-
| Win
| align=center| 3–0
| Jason Derrah
| Submission (armbar)
| UFCF - Everett 1
| 
| align=center| 2
| align=center| N/A
| Everett, Washington, United States
| 
|-
| Win
| align=center| 2–0
| Auggie Padeken
| Decision (unanimous)
| SuperBrawl 17
| 
| align=center| 2
| align=center| 5:00
| Honolulu, Hawaii, United States
| 
|-
| Win
| align=center| 1–0
| Peter da Silva
| Submission
| PPKA: Wenatchee
| 
| align=center| 1
| align=center| N/A
| Wenatchee, Washington, United States
|

Kickboxing record

Legend:

See also
List of male mixed martial artists
List of Canadian UFC fighters

References

External links
 
 
 

Living people
1971 births
Canadian male mixed martial artists
Middleweight mixed martial artists
Mixed martial artists utilizing Muay Thai
Mixed martial artists utilizing judo
Canadian Muay Thai practitioners
Canadian male judoka
Canadian male kickboxers
Cruiserweight kickboxers
Canadian practitioners of Brazilian jiu-jitsu
People awarded a black belt in Brazilian jiu-jitsu
Martial artists from Ontario
Sportspeople from Toronto
Ultimate Fighting Championship male fighters